Jorge Larrieux (born 26 November 1946, in Montevideo) is a Uruguayan lawyer and judge.

Since 2008, Larrieux has been a member of the Supreme Court of Justice, presiding over it in 2009.

References

1946 births
Uruguayan people of French descent
People from Montevideo
20th-century Uruguayan judges
21st-century Uruguayan judges
Supreme Court of Uruguay justices
Living people